André-Paul Duchâteau (8 May 1925 – 26 August 2020) was a Belgian comics writer and mystery novelist.

Biography
He worked with Tibet on the detective comics series Ric Hochet and the more humoristic western comic Chick Bill. He also wrote under the pseudonym Michel Vasseur. Duchâteau additionally wrote several detective novels and radio plays. As a dramatist he is most famous for his play 5 à 7 Avec La Mort (1960), which has been adapted into various media.

Duchâteau died on 26 August 2020.

Awards
1974: Grand Prix de Littérature Policière - French Prize
2003: Prix Saint-Michel - Best story
2010: Grand Prix Saint-Michel

Works
Hans (comic book)

Notes

External links 
Duchâteau's official site (French)
Lambiek Comiclopedia article

1925 births
2020 deaths
Writers from Tournai
Belgian male novelists
Belgian comics writers
Belgian radio writers
Belgian humorists
20th-century Belgian dramatists and playwrights
Belgian male dramatists and playwrights
20th-century Belgian novelists
Belgian mystery writers
Belgian crime fiction writers
Belgian writers in French